The following is a timeline of the presidency of Donald Trump during the third quarter of 2020, from July 1 to September 30, 2020. To navigate quarters, see timeline of the Donald Trump presidency.

Timeline

Overview

President Trump campaigned for the ongoing presidential primaries, accepted the nomination at the Republican National Convention, faced the ongoing presidential election, participated in the first presidential debates, and tackled the ongoing global COVID-19 pandemic by extending the nationwide Centers for Disease Control and Prevention guidelines throughout the month of July.

July 2020

August 2020

September 2020

See also
 Presidential transition of Donald Trump
 First 100 days of Donald Trump's presidency
 List of executive actions by Donald Trump
 List of presidential trips made by Donald Trump (international trips)

References

2020 Q3
Presidency of Donald Trump
July 2020 events in the United States
August 2020 events in the United States
September 2020 events in the United States
2020 timelines
Political timelines of the 2020s by year
Articles containing video clips